Tanggu (Mandarin: 唐谷镇) is a town under the jurisdiction of Tongde County, Hainan Tibetan Autonomous Prefecture, Qinghai, China. In 2010, Tanggu had a total population of 11,259: 5,710 males and 5,549 females: 3,319 under 14 years old, 7,364 aged between 15 and 65 and 576 aged over 65.

References 

Township-level divisions of Qinghai
Tongde County